Stenodynerus is a rather large genus of potter wasps whose distribution spans the Nearctic, Palearctic, Oriental and Neotropical regions. Most of its species lack a transverse carina on the first metasomal tergum. A pair of medial pits on the anterior face of the pronotum and the expansion of the tegulae put this genus close to genera as Parancistrocerus, Hypancistrocerus and Eustenancistrocerus.

Species

Stenodynerus abactus (Brethes)
Stenodynerus accinctus Bohart
Stenodynerus aequisculptus (Kostylev)
Stenodynerus ameghinoi Brethes
Stenodynerus ammonia (Saussure)
Stenodynerus anatropus Bohart
Stenodynerus anormiformis (Viereck)
Stenodynerus anormis (Say)
Stenodynerus apache Bohart
Stenodynerus ascerbius Bohart
Stenodynerus assumptionis (Brèthes)
Stenodynerus australis (Roberts)
Stenodynerus baronii Giordani Soika
Stenodynerus beameri Bohart
Stenodynerus bermudensis (Bequaert)
Stenodynerus bicolor Giordani Soika
Stenodynerus blandoides Bohart
Stenodynerus blandus (Saussure)
Stenodynerus blepharus Bohart
Stenodynerus bluethgeni Vecht
Stenodynerus brevis Giordani Soika
Stenodynerus canus Bohart
Stenodynerus charanthis Bohart
Stenodynerus chevrieranus Saussure
Stenodynerus chinensis (Saussure)
Stenodynerus chisosensis Bohart
Stenodynerus chitgarensis Giordani Soika
Stenodynerus claremontenis (Cameron)
Stenodynerus claviger Gusenleitner
Stenodynerus clypeopictus Kostylev
Stenodynerus cochisensis (Viereck)
Stenodynerus columbaris (Saussure)
Stenodynerus coniodes Bohart
Stenodynerus convolutus (Fox)
Stenodynerus copiosus Gusenleitner, 2012
Stenodynerus corallineipes (Zavattari)
Stenodynerus coreanus Tsuneki
Stenodynerus coyotus (Saussure)
Stenodynerus cyphosus (Zavattari)
Stenodynerus cyrus Gusenleitner, 2012
Stenodynerus dentisquama (Thomson)
Stenodynerus ectonis Bohart
Stenodynerus epagogus Bohart
Stenodynerus farias (Saussure)
Stenodynerus fastidiosissimus (Saussure)
Stenodynerus foveolatus (Brèthes)
Stenodynerus foxensis Bohart
Stenodynerus frauenfeldi (Saussure)
Stenodynerus fundatiformis (Roberts)
Stenodynerus funebris (E. André)
Stenodynerus giacomellii (Bertoni)
Stenodynerus gusenleitneri Giordani Soika
Stenodynerus guzmani (Saussure)
Stenodynerus haladaorum Gusenleitner
Stenodynerus henrici (Brèthes)
Stenodynerus heptneri (Kostylev)
Stenodynerus histrionalis (Roberts)
Stenodynerus hoferi Bohart
Stenodynerus huastecus (Saussure)
Stenodynerus hybogaster Bohart
Stenodynerus ignotus Giordani Soika, 1994
Stenodynerus inca (Saussure)
Stenodynerus incurvitus Gusenleitner
Stenodynerus indicus Gusenleitner, 2006
Stenodynerus innobilis Bohart
Stenodynerus iolans (Cameron)
Stenodynerus jurinei (Saussure)
Stenodynerus kaszabi Giordani Soika
Stenodynerus kazakhstanicus Gusenleitner, 2001
Stenodynerus kennicottianus (Saussure)
Stenodynerus krombeini Bohart
Stenodynerus kurzenkoi Gusenleitner
Stenodynerus kusigematii Yamane & Gusenleitner
Stenodynerus lacetanicus (Blüthgen)
Stenodynerus laetus Giordani Soika
Stenodynerus laticinctus Schulthess
Stenodynerus licinus Bohart
Stenodynerus lindemanni (Cameron)
Stenodynerus lineatifrons Bohart
Stenodynerus lissolobus Bohart
Stenodynerus lixovestis Bohart
Stenodynerus lucidus (Rohwer)
Stenodynerus maculicornis Bohart
Stenodynerus malayanus Giordani Soika
Stenodynerus marii Brethes
Stenodynerus maximus (Schrottky)
Stenodynerus maya (Saussure)
Stenodynerus mayorum Bohart
Stenodynerus mendicus Brethes
Stenodynerus microstictus (Viereck)
Stenodynerus microsynoeca (Schrottky)
Stenodynerus mimeticus (Berthold)
Stenodynerus mimulus (Zavattari)
Stenodynerus monotuberculatus Giordani Soika
Stenodynerus montevidensis (Brethes)
Stenodynerus morawitzi Kurzenko
Stenodynerus morbillosus Giordani Soika
Stenodynerus muelleri (Dusmet)
Stenodynerus multicavus Bohart
Stenodynerus neotomitus Bohart
Stenodynerus nepalensis Giordani Soika
Stenodynerus ninglangensis Ma & Li, 2016
Stenodynerus noticeps Bohart
Stenodynerus nudus (Moravitz)
Stenodynerus occidentalis (Saussure)
Stenodynerus ochrogonius Bohart
Stenodynerus oculeus (Roberts)
Stenodynerus oehlkei Gusenleitner, 2008
Stenodynerus ogasawaraensis Yamane & Gusenleitner
Stenodynerus opalinus Bohart
Stenodynerus orenburgensis André
Stenodynerus otomitus (Saussure)
Stenodynerus painteri Bohart
Stenodynerus pannosus Gusenleitner
Stenodynerus papagorum (Viereck)
Stenodynerus pappi Giordani Soika
Stenodynerus patagoniensis Bohart
Stenodynerus patagonus Brethes
Stenodynerus pavidus (Kohl)
Stenodynerus peninsularis Giordani Soika
Stenodynerus perblandus Bohart
Stenodynerus percampanulatus (Viereck)
Stenodynerus peyroti (Saussure)
Stenodynerus picticrus Thomson
Stenodynerus platensis (Brethes)
Stenodynerus proquinquus (Saussure)
Stenodynerus pulchellus (Saussure)
Stenodynerus pullus Gusenleitner
Stenodynerus pulvinatus Bohart
Stenodynerus pulvivestis Bohart
Stenodynerus punctifrons Thomson
Stenodynerus punjabensis Qasim, Carpenter & Rafi, 2018
Stenodynerus reflexus Ma & Li, 2016
Stenodynerus rossicus Fateryga & Kochetkov, 2020
Stenodynerus rudus Bohart
Stenodynerus rufipes Gusenleitner
Stenodynerus rufomaculatus Yamane & Gusenleitner
Stenodynerus sapidus Giordani Soika
Stenodynerus scabriusculus (Spinola)
Stenodynerus scapulatus (Zavattari)
Stenodynerus schrottkyi (Brethes)
Stenodynerus securus Gusenleitner, 2004
Stenodynerus similibaronii Ma & Li, 2016
Stenodynerus similoides Bohart
Stenodynerus simulatus Gusenleitner
Stenodynerus sonoitensis Bohart
Stenodynerus spinifer (Saussure)
Stenodynerus steckianus Schulthess
Stenodynerus strigatus Ma & Li, 2016
Stenodynerus suffusus (Fox)
Stenodynerus superpendentis Bohart
Stenodynerus taiwanus Kim & Yamane, 2006
Stenodynerus taos (Cresson)
Stenodynerus taosoides Bohart
Stenodynerus tapanecus (Saussure)
Stenodynerus taro Barrera-Medina, 2013
Stenodynerus temoris Bohart
Stenodynerus tenuilamellatus Ma & Li, 2016
Stenodynerus terebrator (Bertoni)
Stenodynerus tergitus Kim
Stenodynerus tokyanus (Kostylev)
Stenodynerus topolo Bohart
Stenodynerus trepidus (Zavattari)
Stenodynerus trotzinai (Moravitz)
Stenodynerus undiformis Bohart
Stenodynerus valliceps Bohart
Stenodynerus ventones (Cameron)
Stenodynerus victoria (Saussure)
Stenodynerus vivax (Zavattari)
Stenodynerus xanthianus (Saussure)
Stenodynerus xanthomelas Herrich-Schäffer

References

Hymenoptera genera
Potter wasps